Tezira Jamwa is a Ugandan teacher, politician and women's rights activist. She represented Tororo in the 1994 Constituent Assembly and thereafter was the Member of Parliament for West Budama North County in Uganda's sixth parliament (1996–2001). She is a founding member of Forum for Women in Democracy (FOWODE) and also served on Tororo District's Service Commission

Background and education 
Jamwa was born in Tororo district. She has a bachelor's degree in Social Works and Social Administration (SWASA). She also obtained both a post-graduate diploma and a Masters in Public Administration from the University of Arkansas.

Career

Legislative 
In 1994, Jamwa successfully contested in the Constituent Assembly elections to represent the women of Tororo as a Constituent Assembly Delegate (CAD). She served in this position between 1994 and 1995 then shortly after, contested for Member of Parliament for West Budama she lost to the then State Minister of Labour, Henry Obbo in the 2001 Parliamentary elections

Governance 
In 1994, Jamwa alongside Winnie Byanyima, Esther Dhugira Opoti , Benigna Mukiibi, Solome Mukisa and Betty Akech Okullo founded the Forum for Women in Democracy (FOWODE), a non governmental organisation

Political 
She was appointed Resident District Commissioner (RDC) for Kaberamaido district, a position she resigned from in 2005 in order to be eligible for the 2006 Ugandan general elections. However, in 2012, it was reported that she had a running term on the Tororo District Service Commission. She still held the same position in 2015 when she vied for "Vice Chairperson of the National Resistance Movement (NRM) Women's League representing the eastern region,

References 

Living people
Members of the Parliament of Uganda
University of Arkansas alumni
20th-century Ugandan politicians
20th-century Ugandan women politicians
Year of birth missing (living people)